George Maxwell Mears was a member of the South Carolina House of Representatives in 1884 and 1885, as well as 1886 and 1887. He was born in Charleston.

References

Members of the South Carolina House of Representatives

Politicians from Charleston, South Carolina
Year of birth missing
Year of death missing
Place of death missing
19th-century American politicians